Blackpool South is a constituency in Lancashire, represented in the House of Commons since 2019 by Scott Benton, a Conservative.

Constituency profile
The seat encompasses the central and southern parts of Blackpool, including the famous Blackpool Tower, the three piers and the Pleasure Beach. Also included is the Bloomfield area, home to Blackpool F.C. In the southern end of the seat, near to the Fylde border, Squires Gate is the site of Blackpool Airport.

Tourism is a major industry in the area, and while Blackpool has been less affected by the decline in domestic holidaymaking than some resorts, there are nonetheless some run-down areas which were once rather more glamorous. Traditionally seaside seats were very safe for the Conservative Party, but for some time it seemed unlikely that the party would win it back. However, they were able to do so in 2019 when they finally achieved a sizeable majority with many gains in northern England.

History
This seat was created for the 1945 general election. This marginal constituency has been represented by both the Conservative and Labour Party parties since the Second World War. It was held by the Conservatives until 1997, when Gordon Marsden, gained it for Labour. He represented the seat for the next 22 years but was defeated in 2019 by the Conservative Scott Benton.

Boundaries

1945–1950: The County Borough of Blackpool wards of Marton, Stanley, Victoria, and Waterloo, and the Borough of Lytham St Annes.

1950–1983: The County Borough of Blackpool wards of Alexandra, Marton, Stanley, Tyldesley, Victoria, and Waterloo.

1983–1997: The Borough of Blackpool wards of Alexandra, Clifton, Foxhall, Hawes Side, Highfield, Marton, Squires Gate, Stanley, Tyldesley, Victoria, and Waterloo.

1997–2010: The Borough of Blackpool wards of Alexandra, Brunswick, Clifton, Foxhall, Hawes Side, Highfield, Layton, Marton, Park, Squires Gate, Stanley, Talbot, Tyldesley, Victoria, and Waterloo.

2010–present: The Borough of Blackpool wards of Bloomfield, Brunswick, Clifton, Hawes Side, Highfield, Marton, Squires Gate, Stanley, Talbot, Tyldesley, Victoria, and Waterloo.

Members of Parliament

Elections

Elections in the 2010s

Elections in the 2000s

Elections in the 1990s

Elections in the 1980s

Elections in the 1970s

Elections in the 1960s

Elections in the 1950s

Elections in the 1940s

See also
List of parliamentary constituencies in Lancashire

Notes

References

External links 
nomis Constituency Profile for Blackpool South, presenting data from the ONS annual population survey and other official statistics

Parliamentary constituencies in North West England
Constituencies of the Parliament of the United Kingdom established in 1945
Politics of Blackpool